Totòtruffa '62 (also known as Totó Vigarista) is a 1961 Italian comedy film directed by Camillo Mastrocinque.

Plot summary 
Antonio is a poor man who has to support his daughter and especially he should pay her stay at a prestigious boarding school to study dance. Antonio so starts with his friend Camillo to deceive the poor people of Rome stealing many sums of money with various confidence tricks. Among the various scams that famous are the receipt of a billion dollars for the prince of Katanga (Antonio in blackface) and the sale of the Trevi Fountain to a foolish entrepreneur.

Cast 
Totò: Antonio Peluffo
Nino Taranto: Camillo
Estella Blain: Diana Peluffo
Ernesto Calindri: Commissario Malvasia
Geronimo Meynier: Franco Malvasia
Luigi Pavese:  cav. Terlizzi
Lia Zoppelli: La direttrice
Carla Macelloni: Paola
Mario Castellani: Il professore
Oreste Lionello: Pippo, l'amico di Franco
John Kitzmiller: L'ambasciatore del Catonga
Ugo D'Alessio: Decio Cavallo, the tourist
Renzo Palmer: Baldassarre
Ignazio Leone: Il vigile urbano
Amedeo Girard: Amilcare
Wee Willie Harris: the singer at "La giostra"
Peppino De Martino: dottor Marchi, il questore
Pietro De Vico: Il contatore di piccioni
Evi Marandi: Una collegiale
Milena Vukotic: Una collegiale

References

External links

1961 films
Films directed by Camillo Mastrocinque
Italian comedy films
Films about con artists
1961 comedy films
Films set in Rome
Films shot in Rome
1960s Italian-language films
1960s Italian films